Changing Seas is a public television series produced by South Florida PBS (WPBT2-WXEL) in Miami, Florida, and narrated by announcers Craig Sechler and Peter Thomas. Changing Seas is a documentary series which accompanies oceanographers and other experts as they seek out new information about our oceans which could lead to scientific breakthroughs.

Changing Seas is distributed by American Public Television. Since its inception, the series has aired in 100% of the nation’s Top 25 PBS markets and on 95% of all PBS stations. Internationally, the programs have been broadcast in around 39 countries, ranging from the Middle East to Asia. Netflix has also carried several seasons of the series.

Funding 
Major funding for this program is provided by the Batchelor Foundation, which claims to encourage people to preserve and protect America's underwater resources.

Additional Funding

Episodes 
For more information on these episodes: Episode Guide

Season 1 (2009)

Season 2 (2010)

Season 3 (2011)

Season 4 (2012)

Season 5 (2013)

Season 6 (2014)

Season 7 (2015)

Season 8 (2016)

Season 9 (2017)

Season 10 (2018)

Season 11 (2019)

Season 12 (2020)

Season 13 (2021)

Season 14 (2022)

Awards

Film Festival Official Selections

References

External links 
 
 Changing Seas TV on Youtube
 Blog
 Instagram

Nature educational television series